Matthew Dean Swinbourn (born 3 April 1975) is an Australian politician. He was educated at Kent Street Senior High School. 

He was elected to the Western Australian Legislative Council at the 2017 state election, as a Labor member for the East Metropolitan Region. His term began on 22 May 2017.

Following the 2021 Western Australian state election, Swinbourn was appointed as Parliamentary Secretary to the Attorney-General and Minister for Electoral Affairs, John Quigley.

Before entering politics, Swinbourn worked at several trade unions. In 2002, he was employed by the Liquor, Hospitality and Miscellaneous Union as a workers' compensation officer. He took a position at the Construction, Forestry, Mining and Energy Union as an industrial officer in 2007 for three years, before taking a position at the Health Services Union. Swinbourn returned to the CFMEU in 2012, where he worked as a lawyer until his election.

References

1975 births
Living people
People educated at Kent Street Senior High School
Australian Labor Party members of the Parliament of Western Australia
Members of the Western Australian Legislative Council
21st-century Australian politicians